The following lists events that happened during 1981 in Sri Lanka.

Incumbents
 President – J. R. Jayewardene
 Prime Minister – Ranasinghe Premadasa
 Chief Justice – Neville Samarakoon

Events
 An mob of Sinhalese origin went on a rampage on the nights of May 31 to June 1, 1981, torching the Jaffna Public Library in an arson attack. It was one of the most violent examples of ethnic biblioclasm in the 20th century.
The England cricket team toured Sri Lanka in February 1982. The tour included two One Day International (ODI) matches and one Test match. 
Sri Lanka had obtained Full Member status of the International Cricket Council (ICC) in 1981, making them the eighth Test playing nation.

Notes 

a.  Gunaratna, Rohan. (1998). Pg.353, Sri Lanka's Ethnic Crisis and National Security, Colombo: South Asian Network on Conflict Research.

References